Khondab County is in Markazi province, Iran. The capital of the county is the city of Khondab. At the 2006 census, the region's population (as Khondab District of Arak County) was 59,112 in 15,075 households. The following census in 2011 counted 58,262 people in the newly formed Khondab County, in 16,669 households. At the 2016 census, the county's population was 54,018 in 16,792 households.

Administrative divisions

The population history and structural changes of Khondab County's administrative divisions over three consecutive censuses are shown in the following table. The latest census shows two districts, five rural districts, and two cities.

References

 

Counties of Markazi Province